The list of ship launches in 1689 includes a chronological list of some ships launched in 1689.


References

1689
Ship launches